Johann Vierthaler (5 July 1869 – December 1957) was a German sculptor.

Following preliminary studies at the Königliche Kunstgewerbeschule in Munich, he studied at the Academy of Fine Arts from 1895 to 1900, under Syrius Eberle. He was a regular participant in exhibitions at the Glaspalast, and is best known for his small bronze figures in the Art Nouveau style.

His work was part of the sculpture event in the art competition at the 1936 Summer Olympics. He also participated in the Große Deutsche Kunstausstellung of 1942; a showcase for Nazi-approved art.

References

Literature

External links
 Works by Vierthaler @ ArtNet

1869 births
1957 deaths
20th-century German sculptors
20th-century German male artists
German male sculptors
Olympic competitors in art competitions
People from Munich